Ambra Computer Corporation is a defunct wholly owned subsidiary of IBM. It introduced a line of personal computers targeted at the home user, sold mainly through mail-order, first in Europe (1992), then in the USA (1993). Ambra had a volume production run of just a year or so; the line was discontinued in 1994 in favor of the IBM Aptiva (except for Canada, where it was not discontinued until 1996).

Models 

 386
 486
 Achiever 2000
 Achiever 3000
 Achiever 4000
 Achiever 5000
 Achiever 7000
 Achiever 9000
 Achiever D
 Achiever DP
 Achiever S
 Achiever T
 Achiever Anthem
 Achiever Hurdla/Sprinta
 Notebook
 Ispirati (Canada)

Positioning 

Ambra PCs were generally positioned at the low-end of the market, and made use of their ties with IBM in marketing materials in order to make the machines appear better quality than the host of clones, since 'real' IBM PCs were known to be expensive.  In reality the machines were fairly low specification, having shadow-mask screens, minimal onboard peripherals, and using low-end processors with the minimum memory and hard disk size at each price.

Television advertising for the brand in the UK used the slogan: "Take your mind for a run."

Aesthetics 

The machines were coloured off-white, which was unusual at the time, since most machines were beige.  Generally the cases were compact and offered little room for expansion.

One notable aspect was the original Ambra mouse, which differed from almost all other designs in the position of its buttons. Conventional mice have the buttons on top: the user clicks by pressing down. The Ambra mouse had the buttons on the front, either side of the cable: the user clicked by pulling their finger backward, in a manner similar to squeezing a trigger. Criticisms led to Ambra changing to a more conventional design: one UK magazine review described the mouse as "looking like a torture device."

References 

1992 establishments in New York (state)
1996 disestablishments in New York (state)
American companies established in 1992
American companies disestablished in 1996
Computer companies established in 1992
Computer companies disestablished in 1996
Defunct computer companies of the United States
Former IBM subsidiaries
Ambra